Heywood and Radcliffe was a county constituency centred on the towns of Heywood and Radcliffe in South Lancashire.  It returned one Member of Parliament (MP) to the House of Commons of the Parliament of the United Kingdom, elected by the first past the post system.

History
Under the Representation of the People Act 1918, the constituency was created by merging the Heywood constituency and part of the Radcliffe-cum-Farnworth constituency for the 1918 general election. It was abolished for the 1950 general election.

Members of Parliament

Elections

Elections in the 1910s

Elections in the 1920s

Elections in the 1930s

General Election 1939–40

Another General Election was required to take place before the end of 1940. The political parties had been making preparations for an election to take place and by the Autumn of 1939, the following candidates had been selected; 
Conservative: 
Labour: A Gaskell

Elections in the 1940s

References

Parliamentary constituencies in North West England (historic)
Constituencies of the Parliament of the United Kingdom established in 1918
Constituencies of the Parliament of the United Kingdom disestablished in 1950
Heywood, Greater Manchester